Suqeh or Suqa or Soogheh may refer to:
 Suqeh, Gilan
 Suqeh, North Khorasan